Pink Eye is a 2008 American horror film directed by James Adam Tucker. The film is set in 
a run-down asylum where drugs are tested in a small town in upstate New York.

Cast

References

External links

2008 films
American horror films
2008 horror films
2000s English-language films
2000s American films